Ali Asad (born 25 December 1988) is a Pakistani cricketer.  A left-handed batsman and wicket-keeper, he represents Karachi cricket teams, having played for their Whites, Blues, Zebras and Dolphins sides.  He scored his maiden first-class century in only his third match, while opening the batting for Karachi Blues against Peshawar.  He has also represented Pakistan Under-19s, averaging 37.20 in Under-19 Test matches, and 45.40 in Under-19 One Day Internationals.

He was the leading run-scorer for National Bank of Pakistan in the 2017–18 Quaid-e-Azam Trophy, with 487 runs in seven matches. He was also the leading run-scorer for National Bank of Pakistan in the 2018–19 Quaid-e-Azam Trophy, with 371 runs in seven matches.

In September 2019, he was named in Northern's squad for the 2019–20 Quaid-e-Azam Trophy tournament.

References

External links
 
 

1988 births
Living people
Pakistani cricketers
Cricketers from Karachi
Karachi Blues cricketers
Karachi Whites cricketers
National Bank of Pakistan cricketers
United Bank Limited cricketers
Sindh cricketers
Quetta cricketers
Karachi Zebras cricketers
Karachi Dolphins cricketers
Quetta Bears cricketers
South Asian Games bronze medalists for Pakistan
South Asian Games medalists in cricket